Aquaforte is a town on the south shore of Newfoundland's Avalon Peninsula in the province of Newfoundland and Labrador, Canada.

The town's economy has always rested primarily on fishing. The harbour has been used as a seasonal fishing station since the 1670s. British and French hostilities played out in harbors all along the Avalon Peninsula in the 18th century, and Aquaforte was no exception. However, the first permanent residents did not settle in Aquaforte until the early 1800s. It has one of the safest harbors in the island and cod was its main industry. In 1902 a resident from Norway, Anders Ellefsen, constructed a factory to process whales in the community. The plant operated for a few years but had to shut down around 1908 because of a decline in the whale population. It was incorporated as a community in 1972.

The Aquaforte post office's postal code, A0A 1A0, is the lowest (alphabetically and numerically first) of any central office in Canada.

Demographics 

See also

 List of cities and towns in Newfoundland and Labrador

References

Towns in Newfoundland and Labrador
Populated coastal places in Canada
Fishing communities in Canada